Al-Daho, alternatively transliterated as al-Dahu and pronounced as ad-Daho or ad-Dahu, is a subject of Baladiyah al-Batha and a historical neighborhood in the Qasr al Hukm District within the former old city walls in southern Riyadh, Saudi Arabia. Bordered by King Faisal Road to the east, al-Thumairi Street to the north, al-Madinah al-Munawwarah Road to the south and Sheikh Muhammad bin Ibrahim Street to the west, it is considered to be one of the last remnants of the old city neighborhoods. The Royal Commission for Riyadh City (then The High Commission for the Development of Arriyadh) presented the plan to resuscitate the neighborhood in 2010 at the 2010 Saudi Travel and Tourism Investment Market and began its implementation 2013.

References 

Neighbourhoods in Riyadh
Tourist attractions in Saudi Arabia